Nordland is a village in Værøy Municipality in Nordland county, Norway. Nordland is the location of the Old Værøy Church, and the site of the old Værøy Airport lies just to the southwest of the village.

References

Værøy
Villages in Nordland